League football may refer to:

The sport of rugby league football
The four fully professional divisions of English football, as opposed to semi-professional and amateur non-league football. See English football league system.